The 2021 Campeonato Ecuatoriano de Fútbol Serie A, known as the LigaPro Betcris 2021 for sponsorship purposes, was the 63rd season of the Serie A, Ecuador's top tier football league, and the third under the management of the Liga Profesional de Fútbol del Ecuador (or LigaPro). The season began on 19 February and ended on 12 December 2021.

Independiente del Valle were the champions, winning their first league title by defeating Emelec in the finals by a 4–2 aggregate score. Barcelona were the defending champions, having won the previous season.

Format
On 1 January 2021, LigaPro president Miguel Ángel Loor confirmed that the 2021 season would be contested by 16 teams and the competition would be played under the same format as the previous season. Three stages were played, with the first and second ones to be played as single round-robin tournaments with all teams playing each other once for a total of 15 matches per stage. The first stage fixture was reversed for the second stage, and the top teams at the end of each stage qualified for the final stage as well as the Copa Libertadores group stage. The finals were a double-legged series between the winners of both stages with a penalty shoot-out deciding the champion in case of a tie in points and goals scored. In case a team won both stages of the season, the finals would not be played and that team would win the championship.

An aggregate table including the matches of both the first and second stages was used to decide international qualification and relegation, with the best two teams (other than the stage winners) qualifying for the Copa Libertadores, the next best three teams qualifying for the Copa Sudamericana, while the remaining Copa Sudamericana berth would be awarded to the champions of the 2021 Copa Ecuador, which was eventually cancelled. The bottom two teams of the aggregate table at the end of the season will be relegated to Serie B.

Teams
16 teams competed in the season. LDU Portoviejo and El Nacional were relegated after finishing in the bottom two places of the aggregate table of the previous season, being replaced by 2020 Serie B champions 9 de Octubre and runners-up Manta.

Stadia and locations

Personnel and kits

Managerial changes

Notes

First stage
The first stage began on 19 February and ended on 19 July 2021.

Standings

Results

Second stage

Standings

Results

Finals
The finals (Third stage) were played by Emelec (first stage winners) and Independiente del Valle (second stage winners). The winners of the double-legged series were the Serie A champions and earned the Ecuador 1 berth in the 2022 Copa Libertadores, and the losers were the Serie A runners-up and earned the Ecuador 2 berth in the 2022 Copa Libertadores. By having the greater number of points in the aggregate table, Emelec played the second leg at home.

Independiente del Valle won 4–2 on aggregate.

Aggregate table

Top scorers
{| class="wikitable" border="1"
|-
! Rank
! Name
! Club
! Goals
|-
| align=center | 1
| Jonathan Bauman
|Mushuc Runa / Independiente del Valle
| align=center | 26
|-
| align=center | 2
| Jhon Cifuente
|Delfín
| align=center | 17
|-
| align=center | 3
| Lisandro Alzugaray
|Universidad Católica
| align=center | 15
|-
| align=center | 4
| Diego Dorregaray
|Deportivo Cuenca
| align=center | 14
|-
| rowspan=2 align=center | 5
| José Fajardo
|9 de Octubre
| rowspan=2 align=center | 12
|-
| Francisco Fydriszewski
|Aucas
|-
| rowspan=4 align=center | 7
| Facundo Barceló
|Emelec
| rowspan=4 align=center | 10
|-
| Jhonny Quiñónez
|Aucas
|-
| Sebastián Rodríguez
|Emelec
|-
| Joao Rojas
|Emelec
|}

Source: FEF

References

External links
 LigaPro's official website
 Ecuadorian Football Federation

A
Ecuador